The following is a list of notable events and releases of the year 1964 in Norwegian music.

Events

May
 The 12th Bergen International Festival started in Bergen, Norway.

June
 The 1st Kongsberg Jazz Festival started in Kongsberg, Norway.

July
 The 4th Moldejazz started in Molde, Norway.

Albums released

Unknown date

K
 Karin Krog
 By Myself (Philips Records)

Deaths

 June
 18 – Egil Rasmussen, author, literature critic and pianist (born 1903).

 July
 1 – Sigurd Islandsmoen, organist and composer (born 1881).

Births

 January
 11 – Torstein Aagaard-Nilsen, contemporary composer.
 27 – Trond Sverre Hansen, jazz drummer.

 February
 1 – Bugge Wesseltoft, jazz pianist, composer, and music producer, Jazzland Recordings.
 23 – John Norum, rock guitarist, Europe.

 March
 13 – Reidar Skår, keyboardist, composer, and music producer.

 April
 22 – Johannes Eick, jazz bassist.

 May
 4
 Roy Lønhøiden, singer, songwriter, and composer.
 Terje Isungset, percussionist and composer.
 13 – Harald Devold, jazz saxophonist (died 2016).
 31 – Carl Petter Opsahl, priest, jazz saxophonist, clarinetist, and journalist.

 June
 1 – Gottfried von der Goltz, violinist and orchestra conductor.
 9 – Roger Arve Vigulf, clarinet soloist and composer.
 13 – Helge Lilletvedt, jazz keyboardist, composer, and music arranger.

 July
 17 – Aslak Dørum, writer and bassist, DumDum Boys.
 24 – Dagfinn Koch, composer and musician.
 26 – Roar Engelberg, panpipes player.

 August
 10 – Kåre Kolve,  jazz saxophonist and composer.

 September
 8 – Joachim «Jokke» Nielsen, rock musician and poet (died 2000).
 19 – Bjarne Brøndbo, singer and songwriter, D.D.E.

 December
 5 – Arve Furset, composer, jazz pianist, keyboardist, and music producer.
 25 – Torbjørn Økland, musician, Vamp.

See also
 1964 in Norway
 Music of Norway
 Norway in the Eurovision Song Contest 1964

References

 
Norwegian music
Norwegian
Music
1960s in Norwegian music